Vittorio De Sisti  (23 November 1940 – 22 April 2006) was a Libyan-born Italian director and screenwriter.

Born in Darna, Libya, De Sisti entered the cinema industry in 1962 as a sound engineer. In 1966, after graduating from the Centro Sperimentale di Cinematografia, he was assistant director Marco Bellocchio and began directing documentaries. In 1968 he debuted  as a director, giving up his career as a sound engineer. In the late 1970s De Sisti focused his career on television. He was married to actress and playwright Lucia Vasilicò.

Selected filmography

 Fiorina la vacca (1972) 
 Private Lessons (1975) 
 La supplente va in città (1979)
 Casa Cecilia (1982)
 Delitti e profumi (1988)

References

External links 
 

1940 births
2006 deaths
Italian film directors
20th-century Italian screenwriters
Italian audio engineers
Centro Sperimentale di Cinematografia alumni
People from Derna, Libya
Giallo film directors
Italian male screenwriters
Libyan emigrants to Italy
20th-century Italian male writers